Garuda Linux is a Linux distribution based on the Arch Linux operating system. Garuda Linux is available in wide range of popular Linux desktop environments, including modified versions of the KDE Plasma 5 desktop environment. It features a rolling release update model using Pacman as its package manager. The term Garuda, which originates from Hinduism, is defined as a divine eagle-like sun bird and the king of birds.

History 
Garuda Linux was released on the 26 March 2020.
Garuda Linux is developed and maintained by developers around the world. It was founded by Shrinivas Vishnu Kumbhar, a university student from India and SGS from Germany.

Features 
Garuda Linux installation process is done with Calamares, a graphical installer. The rolling release model means that the user does not need to upgrade/reinstall the whole operating system to keep it up-to-date inline with the latest release. Garuda Linux uses systemd as its init software. Package management is handled by Pacman via command line, and front-end UI package manager tools such as the pre-installed Pamac.  It can be configured as either a stable system (default) or bleeding edge in line with Arch. Garuda Linux includes colorized UI which comes in various options, with the option to further customize the user preferences.

Desktop environments 
Garuda Linux provides many releases with various desktop environments and package defaults. All have Arch Linux as their base and the Garuda Linux Team provide their own additional package builds via Chaotic-AUR which is part of all releases.

Garuda Downloader is a tool provided by the Garuda Linux team for Windows and Linux to download the latest official release of all editions.

System requirements 
Garuda Linux hardware requirements vary on the desktop environment used, but they are very similar.

 Minimum requirements:
 30 GB storage
 4 GB RAM
 Recommended requirements:
 40 GB storage
 8 GB RAM

Garuda Linux also requires a storage device that contains 4 GB of space for their standard versions. Gaming desktop environments require a storage device with 8 GB storage space available.

Installation 
The official Garuda Linux website supplies ISO images that can be run using a bootable USB device with 4 GB/8 GB of storage space, depending on the ISO image chosen. After the user has their partitions and formats set up on their drive, they can insert the thumbdrive and boot into it from the BIOS. Calamares installer will begin its process and present the user with a GUI installer.

Garuda Linux uses a rolling release update model in which new packages are supplied throughout the day. Software packages are updated using the Pacman package manager.

References 

Arch-based Linux distributions
Linux distributions